Dzianis Uladzimiravich Khramiankou (born 10 July 1996) is a Belarusian freestyle wrestler.

In 2018, he won the gold medal in the men's 97 kg event at the European U23 Wrestling Championship held in Istanbul, Turkey. A year later, he won one of the bronze medals in his event at the 2019 World U23 Wrestling Championship in Budapest, Hungary.

In 2020, he won one of the bronze medals in the men's 125 kg event at the Individual Wrestling World Cup held in Belgrade, Serbia. In March 2021, he qualified at the European Qualification Tournament to compete at the 2020 Summer Olympics in Tokyo, Japan. He competed in the men's 125 kg event. Two months after the Olympics, he competed in the men's 125 kg event at the 2021 World Wrestling Championships held in Oslo, Norway.

References

External links 
 

Living people
Place of birth missing (living people)
Belarusian male sport wrestlers
Wrestlers at the 2020 Summer Olympics
1996 births
Olympic wrestlers of Belarus
Sportspeople from Minsk
21st-century Belarusian people